Sadanand Chavan  is an Independent politician from Ratnagiri district, Maharashtra, India. He is a current Member of Legislative Assembly from Chiplun Vidhan Sabha constituency of Konkan, Maharashtra as an Independent He has been elected in the Maharashtra Legislative Assembly for 2009 and 2014.

Positions held
 2009: Elected to Maharashtra Legislative Assembly
 2014: Re-elected to Maharashtra Legislative Assembly

See also
 Ratnagiri–Sindhudurg Lok Sabha constituency
 Raigad Lok Sabha constituency

References

External links
 Shivsena Home Page
 गणेशोत्सवात भारनियमन नको 

Living people
People from Ratnagiri district
Maharashtra MLAs 2009–2014
Maharashtra MLAs 2014–2019
Marathi politicians
Shiv Sena politicians
Year of birth missing (living people)